Carmen Dell'Orefice (born June 3, 1931) is an American supermodel and actress. She is known within the fashion industry for being the world's oldest working model as of the Spring/Summer 2012 season. She was on the cover of Vogue at the age of 15 and has been modeling ever since. Her daily motto is to enjoy herself, at no-one else's expense.

Early life
Dell'Orefice was born in New York City to parents of Italian and Hungarian descent. Her parents had an unstable relationship characterized by frequent break ups and reconciliations. Dell'Orefice lived in foster homes or with other relatives during her parents' clashes.

Career
At the age of 13, while riding a bus to ballet class, she was approached to model by the wife of photographer Herman Landschoff.  Her test photos, taken at Jones Beach, were a "flop" according to Dell'Orefice. In 1946, her godfather introduced her to Vogue and the 15-year-old signed a modeling contract for $7.50 an hour. She became a favorite model of photographer Erwin Blumenfeld who shot her first Vogue cover in 1946.  She appears in the December 15, 1946 issue of US Vogue; New York Vol. 108, Iss. 11, as Little Red Riding Hood, Snow White and Cinderella along with model Dorian Leigh, actors Ray Bolger and Jose Ferrer.

Dell'Orefice and her mother struggled financially, and her modeling income was not enough to sustain the family.  With no telephone, Vogue had to send runners to their apartment to let Dell'Orefice know about modeling jobs. She roller-skated to assignments to save on bus fares.  She was so malnourished that famed fashion photographers Horst P. Horst and Cecil Beaton had to pin back dresses and stuff the curves with tissue.

Dell'Orefice and her mother were accomplished seamstresses and made extra money making clothes.  One of their customers was Dorian Leigh. Dell'Orefice later became best friends with Leigh's younger sister, model Suzy Parker.  Together they were bridesmaids at Leigh's second wedding to Roger W. Mehle in 1948.

In 1947, Dell'Orefice's rate was raised to $10–$25 per hour.  She appeared on the October 1947 cover of Vogue at age 16, one of the youngest Vogue cover models. She was also on Vogue's November 1948 cover.  She worked with the most famous fashion photographers of the era, including Irving Penn, Gleb Derujinsky, Francesco Scavullo, Norman Parkinson, and Richard Avedon. Dell'Orefice was photographed by Melvin Sokolsky for Harper's Bazaar in 1960. The image, titled Carmen Las Meninas has been collected internationally.  Mark Shaw photographed her for a classic Vanity Fair lingerie campaign, in which Dell'Orefice obscures her face with her hand. She was painter Salvador Dalí's muse.

Retirement and return to modeling

Despite her early successes, modeling agent Eileen Ford declined to represent her and Vogue lost interest in her.  Her thin frame required medical attention: Doctors prescribed shots to start puberty, and her new curves brought her work in catalogs modeling lingerie at $300 per hour. She joined the Ford Modelling Agency in 1953, but retired from modeling after her second marriage in 1959.

After her third divorce and in need of funds, Dell'Orefice returned to modeling in 1978. In 1984 she appeared on the cover of Quarante, a newsstand quarterly publication subtitled, "For the woman of style and substance". In the 1990s and 2000s, she modeled for Isaac Mizrahi's clothing line at Target, as well as Cho Cheng and Rolex. Dell'Orefice is featured regularly in their advertising campaigns appearing in Vogue, W and Harper's Bazaar.

In 1993 she appeared in The Babe Business, a feature documentary filmed in New York about models directed by Don Boyd for Channel Four television.

On July 19, 2011 she was awarded an honorary doctorate from the University of the Arts London, in recognition of her contribution to the fashion industry. The university sponsored a retrospective exhibition curated by illustrator and long-time friend David Downton, featuring Dell'Orefice's Vogue covers, career highlights, and photographs from her personal archives.

Since her return to the industry, Dell'Orefice has appeared in campaigns for Missoni, shot by Giampaolo Sgura; Sephora, shot by Mikael Jansson; Philipp Plein, shot by Steven Klein and H&M, and walked the runway for Anna Sui, Stéphane Rolland, Thierry Mugler and Guo Pei. In 2015, Dell'Orefice collaborated with David Gandy and Isabeli Fontana in the promotion for the reopening of the department store Palacio de Hierro Polanco. She has also featured on the covers of L'Officiel (Australia, Azerbaijan, Switzerland), Marie Claire Arabia and Harper's Bazaar Thailand.

Personal life
Dell'Orefice met and married Bill Miles in the early 1950s. Miles exploited his wife financially, by picking up his wife's modeling agency checks, allowing her only $50 allowance from her earnings. They had a daughter, Laura, and divorced soon after. In 1958, she met photographer Richard Heimann and married him six months later. She decided to retire, after which he left her. Though their marriage didn't work out, it had nothing to do with her "retirement". Carmen and Richard divorced in 1960 but remained close friends for the next 53 years, until his death in 2013. Her third marriage was to a young architect, Richard Kaplan, in the mid-1960s. The marriage lasted eleven years.

In the late 1980s, Dell'Orefice was engaged to television talk-show host David Susskind.  He died before they were married. In 1993, a neighbor introduced her to Norman F. Levy, who was Bernard Madoff's best friend. Levy was her boyfriend for several years.

Financial losses
In the 1980s and 1990s, Dell'Orefice lost most of her money in the stock market. She was forced to auction off her famous modeling photographs from the 1940s to the 1980s through Sotheby's.

In 1994, with what little money she had left, and with money from boyfriend Norman Levy, she invested with notorious financial fraud Bernie Madoff. For twelve years, Ruth and Bernie Madoff and Dell'Orefice and Norman Levy were a "foursome", traveling and partying together on lavish yachts. Levy died in 2005, at age 93, and Madoff was the executor of his will. Levy had $244 million in assets at the time of his death, according to Dell'Orefice. Madoff's fraudulent investment scheme drew on these funds to lure over 13,500 individuals and charities to his Ponzi scheme. She continued to socialize with the Madoffs after Levy's death.

In December 2008 a 68-year-old friend, who invested her life savings with Madoff, telephoned Dell'Orefice to inform her that she too had been bankrupted by the scheme. Dell'Orefice said, "For the second time in my life, I've lost all of my life savings."

Filmography

Bibliography
Staying Beautiful: Beauty Secrets and Attitudes from My Forty Years as a Model (1985)

References

External links 
 
 
 

Living people
1931 births
Actresses from New York City
Female models from New York (state)
American film actresses
American memoirists
American people of Hungarian descent
American people of Italian descent
American television actresses
People associated with the Madoff investment scandal
American women memoirists
21st-century American women